Sinan Bey of Boljanići (died in 1582) was the sanjak-bey of Herzegovina (1552–57, 1563, 1564–67, 1569, 1574–80), and of Bosnia (1562–64). He was born in Boljanići, a village between Pljevlja and Čajniče, at the time part of the Herzegovina Sanjak. His father was Bajram-aga, and he had several siblings, including younger brother Husein-paša Boljanić. He married the sister of Grand Vizier Sokollu Mehmed Pasha. He had construction works finished in Čajniče, Njegošević, Sopot, Cernik, Priboj, Međuriječje. He died in 1582, and was buried in his turbe at Čajniče.

References

Sources

16th-century people from the Ottoman Empire
Ottoman governors of Bosnia
Sanjak of Herzegovina
1582 deaths
People from Pljevlja
Ottoman Bosnian nobility